Ivan Anatolyevich Savin is a Russian former professional ice hockey defenceman who predominantly  played in his hometown with Mechel Chelyabinsk and Traktor Chelyabinsk of the Kontinental Hockey League (KHL). After concluding a 16-year professional career, Savin later embarked on an executive management career and is currently serving as the General manager for Traktor Chelyabinsk.

References

External links

1981 births
Living people
Avtomobilist Yekaterinburg players
Metallurg Magnitogorsk players
HC MVD players
HC Neftekhimik Nizhnekamsk players
Rubin Tyumen players
HC Spartak Moscow players
Traktor Chelyabinsk players
Russian ice hockey defencemen